The 1999 Pitch and putt European Championship held in Chelmsford (Great Britain) was the first edition for the European Pitch and putt Championship promoted by the European Pitch and Putt Association (EPPA), with 6 teams in competition.
Ireland won the championship.

First round

Final round

Final standings

External links
European Pitch and Putt Championship 

Pitch and putt competitions
Pitch and putt European Championship
Sport in Essex
Events in Essex
City of Chelmsford
1990s in Essex